Bradfield's dwarf gecko (Lygodactylus bradfieldi) is a species of gecko, a lizard in the family Gekkonidae. The species is endemic to Southern Africa.

Geographic range
L. bradfieldi is native to southern Angola, Zimbabwe, Botswana, and the Republic of South Africa.

Etymology
The specific name, bradfieldi, is in honor of R.D. Bradfield (1882–1949), who was a South African farmer and naturalist.

Habitat
The preferred natural habitats of L. bradfieldi are desert and savanna.

Description
Dorsally, it is grayish brown, with white and black stripes. Ventrally, it is cream-colored.

Reproduction
L. bradfieldi is oviparous.

References

Further reading
Branch, Bill (2004). Field Guide to Snakes and other Reptiles of Southern Africa. Third Revised edition, Second impression. Sanibel Island, Florida: Ralph Curtis Books. 399 pp. . (Lygodactylus bradfieldi, p. 246 + Plate 91).
Broadley DG (1991). "Geographical Distribution: Lygodactylus bradfieldi Hewitt 1932". Journal of the Herpetological Association of Africa 39 (1): 19.
Hewitt J (1932). "Some New Species and Subspecies of South African Batrachians and Lizards". Annals of the Natal Museum 7 (1): 105-128 + Plate VI. (Lygodactylus bradfieldi, new species, pp. 126–128 + Plate VI, figure 10).
Jacobsen NHG (2011). "The distribution of Lygodactylus bradfieldi Hewitt 1932 in Limpopo Province, South Africa". African Herp News, Newsletter of the Herpetological Association of Africa (53): 21–27.
Rösler H (2000). "Kommentierte Liste der rezent, subrezent und fossil bekannten Geckotaxa (Reptilia: Gekkonomorpha)". Gekkota 2: 28–153. (Lygodactylus bradfieldi, p. 92). (in German).

Lygodactylus
Reptiles described in 1932